Spartanburg Historic District is a district in downtown Spartanburg, South Carolina It was named to the National Register of Historic Places in 1983. The district was expanded in 2000.

History
The original district is centered on Morgan Square, which features the Daniel Morgan Monument. The district was largely built during a commercial expansion in the late 19th and early 20th century that was driven by expansion of the textile industry and railroads.

Architecture
Most of the buildings are two- or three-story masonry structures. The district exhibits a variety of late 19th and early 20th century commercial architecture including Italianate Commercial, Richardson Romanesque Commercial, and simpler Commercial Style architecture. Most of the buildings have retained their original facades.

The two key structures identified in the NRHP application for the original district were the Cleveland Hotel and the Masonic Temple. The Cleveland Hotel, 178 W. Main Street, was a six-story Commercial Style building completed in 1917. After several plans to renovate it failed to come to fruition, the hotel was demolished in late 1991. The Masonic Temple, 188 W. Main Street, is a three-story brick building in Neo-Classical style.

Gallery

References

National Register of Historic Places in Spartanburg, South Carolina
Neoclassical architecture in South Carolina
Buildings and structures in Spartanburg, South Carolina
Buildings designated early commercial in the National Register of Historic Places
Historic districts on the National Register of Historic Places in South Carolina